The Chinese stripe-necked turtle (Mauremys sinensis) or golden thread turtle, is a species of turtle in the family Geoemydidae.

Like many other Geoemydidae, this species hybridizes vigorously with related and not-so-closely related members of its family.

It is one of the two most commonly found species used for divination that have been recovered from Shang dynasty sites, despite the Shang capital being over 1000 km north of its modern-day distribution range.

Description
Chinese-stripe-necked turtles have a green body. As a juvenile, its carapace is grayish green and there are three distinctive ridges. As an adult, the color fades to a brown color and the two ridges gradually disappear. The plastron is ivory in color with small black spots. The male's tail is more coarse and long, while adult females will be larger than the males.

Habitat
Chinese stripe-necked turtles prefer lowland waters such as ponds, canals, and slow-moving rivers.

Distribution
The Chinese stripe-necked turtle is found in China (Hainan, Guangdong & Fujian), Taiwan and northern & central Vietnam.

Conservation  
Chinese stripe-necked turtles are protected by the CITES and IUCN, captive-breeding Chinese stripe-necked turtles are approved. Another reason that affects its population is the invasion of red-eared sliders. In Hong Kong, mainland China and Taiwan and in some other countries, it is a popular pet turtle.

Hybridization
In captivity, hybrids have been produced between this species and Japanese pond turtle, (Mauremys japonica) and the Chinese pond turtle, (Mauremys sinensis) as well as with a male Cyclemys (oldhami) shanensis. The supposed species Ocadia glyphistoma is a hybrid between a male M. sinensis and a female Vietnamese pond turtle, (Mauremys annamensis) a species nearly extinct in the wild. Ocadia philippeni was also shown to be of hybrid origin, a male M. sinensis with a female Cuora trifasciata. Both are either naturally occurring or bred for the pet trade. Any individuals that are available as pets therefore need to be kept separate from other members of the family to prevent hybridization.

Reproduction
After mating, the female turtle may lay 5-20 eggs that hatch about 60 days when needed.

Footnotes

References

 (2005): On the hybridisation between two distantly related Asian turtles (Testudines: Sacalia × Mauremys). Salamandra 41: 21–26. PDF fulltext
 Keightley (1979): Sources of Shang History: The Oracle-Bone Inscriptions of Bronze Age China. David N. Keightley. University of California Press. 1979.
 Spinks, Phillip Q.; Shaffer, Bradley H.; Iverson, John B. & McCord, William P. (2004) : "Phylogenetic hypotheses for the turtle family Geomydidae". Molecular Phylogenetics and Evolution 32, 164–182. Academic Press, Cambridge:MA.

Mauremys
Reptiles described in 1870
Reptiles of China
Reptiles of Taiwan
Reptiles of Vietnam
Taxonomy articles created by Polbot
Critically endangered fauna of China